Karnataka is one of the highest economic growth states in India with an expected GSDP (Gross State Domestic Product) growth of 9.5% in the 2021–22 fiscal year. The total expected GSDP of Karnataka in 2022–2023 is about $240 billion. Karnataka recorded the highest growth rates in terms of GDP and per capita GDP in the last decade compared to other states. In 2008–09, the tertiary sector contributed the most to GSDP (US$31.6 billion─55 percent), followed by the secondary sector ($17 billion─29 percent), and the primary sector (US$9.5 billion─16 percent).

With an overall GDP growth of 56.2% and a per capita GDP growth of 43.9% in the last decade, Karnataka surpassed all other states in India, pushing Karnataka's per capita income in Indian Rupee terms to sixth place. Karnataka received US$2,026.4 million worth of Foreign Direct Investment for the fiscal year 2008–09, placing it at the third spot among states in India. At the end of 2004, the unemployment rate of Karnataka was 4.57% compared to a national rate of 5.99%. For the fiscal year 2006–07 the inflation rate of Karnataka was 4.4%, which was less than the national average.

Between 2011-12 and 2017-18, the GSDP of the state grew at a Compound Annual Growth Rate (CAGR) of 13.11 per cent to reach  12.69 trillion (US$196.88 billion) and the net state domestic product (NSDP) grew at a CAGR of 12.83 per cent to reach  11.45 trillion (US$177.68 billion).

A fiscal year in Karnataka begins on 1 April of the previous calendar year and ends on 31 March of the year with which it is numbered.

After Bengaluru Urban, Dakshina Kannada (Mangaluru) Hubli-Dharwad and Belagavi districts contribute the highest revenue to the state respectively.

Agriculture and Livestock

Agriculture is the primary occupation of most of Karnataka's rural people. A total of 123,100 km2 of land is cultivated in Karnataka, constituting 64.60% of the total geographical area of the state. According to the 2001 census, farmers and agricultural labourers formed 56% of the workforce of Karnataka. Agriculture in Karnataka is heavily dependent on the southwest monsoon since the extent of arid land in the state is second only to Rajasthan. Only 26.5% of sown area (30,900 km2) is subjected to irrigation. The state has three agricultural seasons – Kharif (April to September), Rabi (October to December) and Summer (January to March).

Given below is a table of 2015 national output share of select agricultural crops and allied segments in Karnataka based on 2011 prices

Primary Crops grown in Karnataka 
The main crops grown are Rice, ragi, jowar (sorghum), maize, and pulses (tur and gram) in addition to oilseeds and a number of other cash crops. Cashews, coconut, arecanut, cardamom, chillies, cotton, sugarcane and tobacco are also produced. Karnataka is the largest producer of coarse cereals, coffee, raw silk and tomatoes among the states in India. Horticultural crops are grown in an area of 16,300 km2 and the annual production is about 9.58 million tons. The income generated from horticulture constitutes over 40% of income generated from agriculture and it is about 17% of the state's GDP. In floriculture, Karnataka occupies the second position in India in terms of production and 700 tons of flowers (worth  500 million) were produced in 2004–05.	

A majority of the thirty-five billion rupee silk industry in India is headquartered in Karnataka State, primarily in Mysore and North Bangalore regions of Doddaballapura, the site of a planned 700 million "Silk City".

Education

Karnataka has one of the largest concentrations of higher education including medical and engineering colleges. Apart from Bengaluru, places like Mangalore, Hubli–Dharwad, Mysore, Belagavi, Udupi, Tumakuru and Davanagere have been producing professionals for the Information Technology industry. Muddenahalli, in North Bangalore, is the site of the upcoming Sri Sathya Sai Baba University and College of Medicine and a branch of the Visvesvaraya Institute of Advanced Technology. Devanahalli is set to be the location of a 95 billion Devanahalli Business Parks, which will contain Aerospace Education Special Economic Zones, near the Bengaluru International Airport. The North Bangalore region is set to be a premier educational hub of Karnataka. There are many prestigious educational and research institutions in Bengaluru such as Indian Institute of Science, National Law School of India University, University Visvesvaraya College of Engineering, Ramaiah Institute of Technology, R.V. College of Engineering, PES University, Sir M. Visvesvaraya Institute of Technology, REVA University, Indian Institute of Management Bangalore, International Institute of Information Technology, Bangalore, Jain University etc. 

Dharwad in the northern part of the state is another hub for education with several engineering colleges With National importance institutions like AIIMS,IIT Dharwad, IIIT Dharwad, Dakshina Hindi Prachara Sabha, Karnataka Institute of Medical Sciences (KIMS) and Universities like Karnataka University, University of Agricultural sciences Dharwad, Karnataka State Law University, KLE University, SDM University are present in Dharwad & Hubballi City, hence called Education Hub and a central university is present in Kalaburgi. These developments are set to contribute significantly to Karnataka's economy by creating jobs, expanding educational opportunities, and spurring infrastructure development. Manipal Academy of Higher Education is one of the best university present in Manipal, Udupi city . With many great and prestigious Institutions Karnataka has been the Educational Hub of India.

Industry
Karnataka evolved as the manufacturing hub for some of the largest public sector industries of India after India's independence. Hindustan Aeronautics Limited, which is dedicated to research and development activities for indigenous fighter aircraft for the Indian Air Force, employs over 9,500 employees making it one of the largest public sector employers in Karnataka.

Other heavy industries such as National Aerospace Laboratories, Indian Telephone Industries, Bharat Earth Movers Limited, Bharat Electronics Limited, Hindustan Machine Tools and Indian subsidiaries of Volvo and Toyota are also headquartered in Bangalore. India's national space agency, the Indian Space Research Organization, is headquartered in Bangalore and employs approximately 20,000 people.

TVS Motors has a motorcycle manufacturing plant at Mysore and Tata Motors at Dharwad. Karnataka state has many companies engaged in the manufacturing of electrical equipment and machinery like Kirloskar, ABB Group, Kavika, Larsen and Toubro etc. This may be due to the location of the Central Power Research Institute at Bangalore. Many multinational companies have set up their manufacturing units in Karnataka such as BASF, and Bosch.

The state owns sugar factories in the northern region, edible oil processing factories, pharmaceutical factories, textile processing centers, and steel producing facilities. Vishwesharaiya steel plant at Bhadravati is run by SAIL.

Minerals
Lithium has been discovered in Karnataka's Mandya district which is 100 km from Bangalore, becoming the Nation's first-ever Lithium reserves so far confirmed at 1,600 tonnes.

Gold, iron ore, quartz, limestone, manganese, kyanite and bauxite are some of the minerals that are found in Karnataka. After the closure of the Kolar Gold Fields mine, the only company in India that produces gold by mining and extracting it from the ore is Hutti Gold Mines Limited that has plants at Hutti and Chitradurga in Karnataka. The major mines of manganese and iron ore are located at Sandur in Bellary district. Visweswaraiah Iron and Steel Ltd. at Bhadravathi and Jindal Vijayanagar Steel Ltd. at Toranagal are engaged in the production of iron and steel. Indian Aluminium Company Ltd. (Hindalco) has an aluminum plant near Belgaum. Mysore Minerals Limited is in the mining and production of chromite industry in Hassan district. Rajashree Cements at Adityanagar, Vasavadatta Cements at Sedam and The Associated Cement Company Ltd. at Wadi are engaged in the production of cement. Uranium deposits have been found in Deshnur, a small village near Belgaum.

Information and biotechnology

Karnataka is the leader in the information technology sector in India and its capital, Bangalore, is known as the Silicon Valley of India. In the IT sector, Karnataka generated a total revenue of  516.5 billion in the financial year 2006–07 which included  487 billion from software exports and  29.5 billion from hardware exports. A total of 1973 companies in the state are involved in Information Technology-related business. While the bulk of the IT related companies are located in Bangalore, some companies are located in Mysore and Mangalore as well. Bangalore is also the headquarters of Wipro and Infosys which are among the top three IT companies in India in regards to market capitalization. The Nandi Hills area in Devanahalli outskirts is the site of the upcoming $22 Billion, 50 square kilometre BIAL IT Investment Region, one of the largest infrastructure projects in the history of Karnataka.

As of June 2006, Karnataka housed 55% of biotechnology related companies in India. Bangalore is also the home of the largest biocluster in India with total revenues of  14 billion and having 158 of the 320 companies working on biotechnology in India. Karnataka has a headcount of over 6,800 scientists involved in biotech research and out of twenty eight biotech companies that were registered in India in the year 2005–06, 27 were located in Karnataka.

Banking in Karnataka

Karnataka, particularly the coastal districts of Dakshina Kannada and Udupi, is sometimes called the "cradle of banking" in India. This is because seven of the country's leading banks, Canara Bank, Syndicate Bank, Corporation Bank, Vijaya Bank, Karnataka Bank, Vysya Bank and the State Bank of Mysore originated in this state. The first five in the above list of banks were established in the districts of Dakshina Kannada and Udupi. These districts have among the best distribution of banks in India—a branch for every 500 persons. Between 1880 and 1935, twenty two banks were established in coastal Karnataka, nine of them in the city of Mangalore.

As of March 2009, Karnataka had 5,759 branches of different banks servicing the people of the state. The number of people served by each branch was 10,000 which was lesser than the national average of 15,000, thereby indicating better penetration of banking in the state.

Infrastructure

Roads

The state is well connected to its six neighboring states and other parts of India through 14 National Highways (NH); it accounts for about six percent of the total NH network in India.

Its district centers are linked through 114 State Highways (SH)

The total road network of NH, SH, and district roads is about 2,07,379 km, of which 1,27,541 km is surfaced (61.5 percent)

Road Type Road length (km)

National highways: 4,396

State highways: 28,311

District roads: 19,801

Ports

New Mangalore Port (2010–11).

Total traffic handled: 67.30 MTA.

Total imports handled: 23.6 MTA.

Total exports handled: 32.9 MTA.

Number of vessels: 1,186

Cruise vessels: 26

Revenue: US$65 million

Karwar Port (2007–08)

Total cargo handled: 2.7 MTA

Total imports and exports: 6 MTA

Revenue: US$2.7 million

25 Private liquid cargo tanks: 75,000 MT

Airports

Domestic airports

Hubballi Airport (Upcoming as International Airport)
Belgaum Airport
Mysore Airport
Gulbarga Airport
Shivamogga Airport
Ballari Airport

International airports
Kempegowda International Airport, Devanahalli – formerly Bangalore International Airport
Mangalore International Airport, Bajpe

Railways

>Railway network of 3,172 km

>South Western Railway covers almost part of Karnataka & it's headquarter is at Hubballi 

SSS Hubballi Junction's Platform 1 is the "World's Longest Platform" and also holds the Guinness World Record!

>There are 3 divisions in SWR
 Hubballi Railway Division
 Bengaluru Railway Division
 Mysore Railway Division

There are Two Railway Heritage Museums in Karnataka :
 Mysore Railway Museum
 Hubballi Railway Heritage Museum

Urban transport

Metro rail and mono-rail projects are underway in Bangalore. The first phase of the Namma Metro is complete and covers a total of 42.3 km. Second phase is in testing phase and targeted to operate by mid 2021.

Ongoing projects

Hassan–Sakhleshpura–Mangalore line gauge conversion is completed. Both freight and passenger trains run on this route on a daily basis connecting the seaport city of Mangaluru to the state capital of Bengaluru and Mysuru.

Key connectivity projects, doubling of Mysore–Bangalore railway line, Gadag–Bagalkot, Bangalore–Hassan to be taken up in the near future.

Power

Generation: Karnataka Power Corporation Limited and IPPs (GMR/Jindal/ Bhoruka)

KPCL has an installed capacity of over 9315 MW.

Number of consumers: 16.3 million

Independent power producers have installed capacity of 2,005 MW.

 KPCL -Karnataka Power Corporation Ltd.
 IPPs is Independent Power Producers

Transmission: Karnataka Power Transmission Corporation Limited (KPTCL).

Area covered: 192,000 km2

Sub stations: 1,205

Transmission lines: 28,000 km, 33 kV, 130,000 km of 11 kV.

LT lines: 451855 km

Distribution transformers: 1,50,000

Physical infrastructure – power

Distribution/supply: Electricity Supply Companies (ESCOMs)

Bangalore Electricity Supply Company (BESCOM)

Mangalore Electricity Supply Company (MESCOM)

Hubli Electricity Supply Company (HESCOM)

Gulbarga Electric Supply Company (GESCOM)

ChamundeshwariElectric Supply Corporation (CESC)

Source: Power sector at a glance as in July 2009‖, Karnataka Power Transmission Corporation Limited website, accessed 23 September 2009.

Telecommunications

Leading telecom companies in the sectors of telecommunication network, basic telephony services (both wire line and wireless) and networking services for telecommunication equipment are operating in the state.

The entire State is networked via Optic FibreCables (OFC) by the state-run BSNL (formerly DOT) as well as private companies like Bharti, Reliance, VSNL and TATA Tele Services.

Last Mile Access is provided by BSNL as well as TATA Tele Services in various parts of the state. Bhartiand Reliance Communications provide the Last Mile Access directly to the customer in all major cities in Karnataka.

Seven new telephone exchanges were opened in 2007–2008.

Telecom service providers in Karnataka.

BSNL, BhartiAirtel, Reliance Communications, Vodafone Essar, Spice Communications, Tata Teleservices Ltd.

Key statistics (2007–08)

Cellular subscribers: about 10 million

Internet/broadband

Subscribers: about 0.8 million

Telecom towers: about 14,000

Post offices: 9,826

Telephone connections provided: 2,610

Telephone exchanges: 2,727

Industrial infrastructure

Karnataka Industrial Area Development Board (KIADB) and Karnataka State Industrial Investment Development Corporation (KSIIDC) are jointly responsible for the development of industrial infrastructure in the state.

Directorate of Commerce and Industries has set up a district and taluk industrial centres across the state to facilitate investment

The Government of Karnataka is promoting the development of several SEZs across Karnataka such as pharma and biotech SEZ, food processing and agro-based industries and textiles SEZ at Hassan and IT and Coastal SEZs at Mangalore.

Key industrial clusters

IT/ITES cluster in electronic city and Whitefield (Bangalore).

Food Parks – 4 old State sponsored and 2 new MoFPI sponsored Food Parks in 6 Districts of Karnataka

Biotech park/cluster in electronic city, Bangalore.

Integrated Food Parks in Hiriyur, Bagalkote, Jewargi & Malur for pay-n-use common facilities & MSME Food Processing Manufacturers

Machine tool cluster at Peenyaindustrial estate

Textile cluster at Doddaballapur

Foundry cluster at Belgaum

Industrial valve cluster at Hubli–Dharwad

Coir clusters at Hassan.

Handicrafts cluster at Channapatna.

Coffee production and processing cluster in Madekeri

SEZs in Karnataka

Notified: 27

Formal approvals: 52

In-principle approvals: 9

Source: StatewiseSEZs in India, www.sezindia.nic.in. accessed 23 September 2009

Water supply
The water supply is provided by the local authorities like municipalities and panchayats. The first hydroelectric plant in the state was built at Shivanasamudra Falls on the Kaveri River in 1902.

Electrical supply
Karnataka has an installed capacity of 27 gigawatts (GW) of electricity, of which 12 GW comes from renewable energy sources. The state is India's top producer of solar energy, with an installed capacity of 5.16 GW.

Karnataka Power Transmission Corporation Limited (KPTCL) is the sole provider of electricity for the state. The Linganamakki reservoir will supply around 35 percent of power to the state. Electric power from KPTCL is distributed through distribution companies like Bangalore Electricity Supply Company (BESCOM), Mangalore Electricity Supply Company (MESCOM), Gulbarga Electricity Supply Company (GESCOM), Hubli Electricity Supply Company (HESCOM) and Chamundesvary Electricity Supply Company (CESCOM) for different parts of the state. A good number of windmills were present. The Raichur Thermal Power Station and Near Bellary (Kuduthini). Karnataka is also the location of companies like SELCO (India), which is promoting the use of solar electricity among the rural areas of the state and is also a twice winner of the Ashden Awards.

See also
Economy of Bangalore
Economy of Mangalore
Mysore

Notes